Malachi Boateng (born  5 July 2002) is an English footballer who plays for Queen's Park, on loan from Crystal Palace.

Early life
Boateng was born in England and has Ghanaian heritage. He is the brother of former Crystal Palace academy footballer Hiram Boateng.

Career
Boateng joined the Crystal Palace youth system at the age of 11, signing his first professional contract with the in October 2019. He won both the Under-18 and Under-23 player of the season awards during his time in the youth teams, and made three appearances for the Under 21 team in the 2021–22 EFL Trophy. He traveled with the first-team squad on their pre-season tour to Singapore and Australia in advance of the 2022–23 season, making two appearances as substitute.

Boateng joined Scottish Championship side Queen's Park on loan for the 2022-23 season on 12 August 2022. He made his professional debut by starting for Queens Park in a 3-2 victory over Partick Thistle at Ochilview Park a day later.

References

External links
 

Living people
2002 births
Crystal Palace F.C. players
Queen's Park F.C. players
English footballers
English people of Ghanaian descent
Scottish Professional Football League players
Black British sportsmen